The 1963 European Amateur Team Championship took place 3–7 July at Falsterbo Golf Club in Falsterbo, Sweden. It was the third men's golf European Amateur Team Championship.

Venue 

The hosting club, Sweden's third oldest golf club, was founded in 1909.  Its links course, located on a headland peninsula at the south west tip of Sweden, was opened in 1934, initially designed by Robert Turnbull and later redesigned by Gunnar Bauer, Peter Nordwall and Peter Chamberlain.

The course later came to host the 1986 PLM Open on the European Tour.

Format 
All participating teams played two qualification rounds of stroke-play, counting the four best scores out of up to six players for each team. The four best teams formed flight A, the next four teams formed flight B, the next three teams formed flight C and the last three teams formed flight D.

The standings in each flight was determined by a round-robin system. All teams in the flight met each other and the team with most points for team matches in flight A won the tournament, using the scale, win=2 points, halved=1 point, lose=0 points. In each match between two nation teams, three foursome games and six single games were played.

Teams 
14 nation teams contested the event. Each team consisted of a minimum of six players.

Winners 
Team England, making its second appearance in the championship, won the gold, earning 6 points in flight A. Defending champion and host country Sweden took the silver medal on 4 points and West Germany, for the first time on the podium in the three-year history of the championship, earned the bronze on third place.

Individual winner in the opening 36-hole stroke-play qualifying competition was  Rune Karlfeldt, Sweden, with a score of 3-under-par 139, three shots ahead of nearest competitor. Angelo Croce, Italy, shot a new course record in the second round, with a score of 67 over 18 holes on the Falsterbo course.

Results 
Qualification rounds

Team standings

Individual leaders

 Note: There was no official recognition for the lowest individual score.

Flight A

Team matches

Team standings

Flight B

Team matches

Team standings

Flight C

Team standings

Flight D

Team standings

Final standings

Sources:

See also 
 Eisenhower Trophy – biennial world amateur team golf championship for men organized by the International Golf Federation.
 European Ladies' Team Championship – European amateur team golf championship for women organised by the European Golf Association.

References

External links 
European Golf Association: Full results

European Amateur Team Championship
Golf tournaments in Sweden
European Amateur Team Championship
European Amateur Team Championship
European Amateur Team Championship